Asota orbona is a moth of the family Erebidae first described by Samuel Constantinus Snellen van Vollenhoven in 1863. It is found in Indonesia, Papua New Guinea and Queensland.

The wing is yellowish with brown shading. It has four spots on its forewing with black dots on the thorax and the bases of the forewing. The wingspan is about 50 mm.

The larvae feed on Ficus species.

Subspecies
Asota orbona discoidalis (Seram)
Asota orbona ocellata (Papua New Guinea)
Asota orbona ochrealis (Ambon, Kai Islands, Seram)
Asota orbona orbona (Indonesia, Papua New Guinea) 
Asota orbona queenslandica (Queensland)
Asota orbona significans (Indonesia, Papua New Guinea)

References
Zwier, Jaap. "Asota orbona orbona Vollenhoven 1863". Aganainae (Snouted Tigers). Retrieved 5 August 2019.

Asota (moth)
Moths of Asia
Moths of Oceania
Moths described in 1863